John Charles Harston (7 October 1920 – 25 June 2013) was an English professional footballer who played as a right back.

Career
Born in Barnsley, Harston played for Ardsley Athletic, Wolverhampton Wanderers, Dudley Town, Barnsley, Bradford City, Scarborough and Denaby United.

For Bradford City he made 24 appearances in the Football League.

Sources

References

1920 births
2013 deaths
English footballers
Ardsley Athletic F.C. players
Wolverhampton Wanderers F.C. players
Dudley Town F.C. players
Barnsley F.C. players
Bradford City A.F.C. players
Scarborough F.C. players
Denaby United F.C. players
English Football League players
Association football fullbacks